John Anthony David Hobbs (born 30 November 1935) is an English former first-class cricketer.

Hobbs was born in the Liverpool suburb of Aigburth in November 1935. He later studied at St Peter's College at the University of Oxford. While studying at Oxford, he played first-class cricket for Oxford University, making his debut against Gloucestershire at Oxford in 1956. He played first-class cricket for Oxford until 1958, making a total of eighteen appearances. Hobbs scored a total of 614 runs in his eighteen matches, at an average of 17.54. He passed fifty on three occasions, with a high score of 95 against Middlesex in 1975.

References

External links

1935 births
Living people
People from Aigburth
Alumni of St Peter's College, Oxford
English cricketers
Oxford University cricketers